Abdullah Majrashi (born 24 August 1997) is a Saudi Arabian footballer who plays as a midfielder for Saudi Pro League side Al-Raed.

Personal life
Abdullah is the brother of the footballer Fahad Majrashi.

Career statistics

Club

References

External links
 

1997 births
Living people
Saudi Arabian footballers
Association football midfielders
Saudi Professional League players
Al-Ahli Saudi FC players
Ohod Club players
Al-Raed FC players
Saudi Arabia youth international footballers
Footballers at the 2018 Asian Games
Asian Games competitors for Saudi Arabia
21st-century Saudi Arabian people
20th-century Saudi Arabian people